Fox Sports was a Turkish television channel owned by Fox Networks Group. It was launched on 10 April 2007 and broadcast live events such as NCAA, NFL, NHL, MLB, NASCAR and golf. The channel closed on March 1, 2020.

Programming rights

American Football
National Football League

Australian Rules Football
Australian Football League

Baseball
Major League Baseball

Basketball
National Basketball Association
National Collegiate Athletic Association

Golf
PGA Tour

Hockey
National Hockey League

Motorsports
NASCAR

Rugby League
National Rugby League

See also
Fox Sports International
ESPN Holland

External links
Fox Sports official website

Defunct television channels in Turkey
Defunct television channels in Greece
Defunct television channels in Malta
Fox Sports International
Sports television in Turkey
Sports television in Greece
Television channels and stations established in 2007
Television channels and stations disestablished in 2020